Trolltinden (historically: Sagtinden) is a mountain in Dovre Municipality in Innlandet county, Norway. The mountain located in a group of mountains called Smiubelgen. The mountain is surrounded by several other notable mountains including Veslesmeden and Storsmeden to the southeast; Ljosåbelgen and Bråkdalsbelgen to the south; Sagtindan and Indre Bråkdalshøe to the west, and Gråhøe and Vassberget to the northwest.

See also
List of mountains of Norway

References

Dovre
Mountains of Innlandet